Azul Airport is a public use airport located near Azul, Buenos Aires, Argentina.

See also
List of airports in Argentina

References

External links 
 Airport record for Azul Airport at Landings.com
 

Airports in Buenos Aires Province
Azul, Buenos Aires